Lars Burmeister (born 26 April 1984, in Hamburg, West Germany), is a German male model.

Career
Burmeister started his modeling career at the age of 23.  He has appeared on numerous magazine covers including V Man, Euroman and Vogue.  Burmeister's appearance in print campaigns include Louis Vuitton, Hugo Boss, Dolce & Gabbana, Versace, Valentino SpA, Armani, Michael Kors, Zara, Bottega Veneta, Etro, Roberto Cavalli, Iceberg and Missoni.

References

External links
 
 Ford Models profile

1984 births
Living people
German male models
People from Hamburg